Ficus vasta (warka) is a fig plant found in Ethiopia and Yemen. The tree is a species of sycamore-fig.

Description
Ficus vasta is a large tree, with a massive trunk, and spreading branches whose tips form an inverted bowl up to 50m in diameter. It reaches a height of 25m. The trunk is smooth and grey, and is commonly buttressed. The bark is smooth and grey, except on young branches where it is yellow-white-brown, and flaking when dry. The leaves are elliptical, reaching 25 x 20 cm, hairy, and rough to the touch.  They are often distinguished from other species of fig by its large heart-shaped leaves and massive trunk.

The figs grow in clusters, are 2 cm in diameter, and spherical. When ripe they are green with pale green spots. They are hairy and their opening is clear.

Ficus vasta grows as an epiphyte or as a chasmophyte.  As the young tree grows, it sends down roots which thicken and become trunk-like, often fusing together and completely engulfing the trunk of the tree or rock it grew on.  This process often kills the host tree and completely engulfs or covers the rock face.

Uses
The figs are edible, being collected by children. They are also eaten by sheep, goats, monkeys (including baboons) and birds. The figs can be eaten right off the tree, or when half-dry, or when dry. Dry figs are usually stored and eaten as needed.

Ecology
Ficus vasta grows in or near the Horn of Africa. It is primarily endemic to Ethiopia and Yemen, but can also be found in the Sudan, Somalia and Saudi Arabia, and into Uganda and Tanzania in the African Great Lakes region. The tree grows along rivers forming stands or thickets. Additionally, it is found in dry savannah, and grows at elevations between 1,400m and 2,500m. It is not cultivated under domestication, and is disappearing due to human pressure, mainly in its use as firewood.

See also 

 Strangler fig

References

Sources

 Berg, C.C. 1988. New taxa and combinations in Ficus (Moraceae) in Africa. Kew Bulletin 43: 77- 97.
 Berg, C.C. 1989. Moraceae. In: R.M. Polhill (ed.) Flora of Tropical East Africa. A.A. Balkema, Rotterdam.
 Berg, C.C. 1990. Distribution of African taxa of Ficus (Moraccae). [Proc. 12th AETFAT]. Mitt. inst. Allg. Bot. Hamburg 23: 401-405.
 Berg, C.C. 1990. Annotated check-list of the Ficus species of the African floristic region, with special reference and a key to the taxa of southern Africa. Kirkia, 13: 253-291.
 Berg, C.C. 1991. Moraceae. In: E. Launert & G.Y. Pope (eds) Flora Zambesiaca 9, 6. Natural History Museum, London.
 Berg, C.C. & Hijman, M.E.E. 1989. Chapter 11. Ficus. Flora of Tropical East Africa (ed. R.M. Polhill). 43-86. A.A. Balkema, Rotterdam.
 Berg, C.C., Hijman, M.E.E. & Weerdenburg, J.C.A. 1984. Moracées (incl. Cécropiacées). Flore du Gabon 26: 1–276.
 Berg, C.C., Hijman, M.E.E. & Weerdenburg, J.C.A. 1985. Moracées (incl. Cécropiacées). Flore du Cameroun 28: 1–298.
 Berg, C.C. & Wiebes, J.T. 1992. African fig trees and fig wasps. Koninklijke Nederlandse Akademie van Wetenschappen. Amsterdam, 1-298 pp.
 Bouček Z., A. Watsham & J.T. Wiebes, 1981. The fig wasp fauna of the receptacles of Ficus thonningii (Hymenoptera, Chalcidoidea). Tijdschrift Voor Entomologie, 124(5): 149-233.
 Burrows, J. & Burrows, S. 2003. Figs of southern & south-central Africa. Umdaus Press, Hatfield. 379 pp.

vasta
Taxa named by Peter Forsskål
Flora of Ethiopia
Flora of Yemen
Flora of Sudan